Office Romance. Our Time is a 2011 Russian-Ukrainian romantic comedy film directed by Sarik Andreasyan. It is a remake of the 1977 Soviet film Office Romance, directed by Eldar Ryazanov.

Plot
Lyudmila Kalugina is a ruthless businesswoman, owner of a credit rating agency. Anatoly Novoseltsev is a financial analyst, fanatical biker and father of two children. A colleague and friend of Novoseltsev, Olga Petrovna Ryzhova, tries to convince him of the fact that he is worthy of being head of the department. During her years as a university student, she dated the new deputy director, Yuri Samokhvalov. This trio - Novoseltsev, Samokhvalov and Olga - studied in the same group at the university. Having met his old friend, Samokhvalov tries to promote him to the head of the department, taking advantage of his position and influence on Kalugina. All attempts to influence her are ineffectual. Employees call her "our frump" behind her back. In Novoseltsev, she sees a sluggish and unemployed employee. Samokhvalov suggests that he slightly flirt with the harsh businesswoman to advance in his career, and invites both heroes to go to Turkey to an after-work party, where he tries to get them together. Offended that Kalugina ignores his courtship, drunk Anatoly Efremovich arranges a scandal and in the presence of the guests calls her "hard" and "heartless", and then drops her into the pool.

The next day Novoseltsev and Kalugina find themselves in the same caravan of a cable car, which, by coincidence, stops suddenly. In conversation for the expectation of fixing the funicular, the man tries to apologize, but he does it so clumsily that he makes Lyudmila Prokofievna cry. He tries to calm her down, and she tells him about her solitude. At this point, the heroes, who had recently experienced mutual hostility, make the first step towards each other. Anatoly Efremovich continues to make romantic advances towards the boss — first from the desire to get a promotion, but later he develops real feelings. And Ryzhova still has not forgotten her old flame Samokhvalov, which becomes public knowledge because of a conflict between the latter and Novoseltsev. They quarrel with Kalugina. Samokhvalov is fired for a sex-tape, in which he makes love in the office of a businesswoman with a woman similar to her (it turns out to be Ryzhova in a wig). And he himself turns out to be an agent from a competing firm, whose task was to undermine the reputation of the agency.

At the decisive moment Samohvalov with the help of Ryzhova replaces the flash drive with a presentation left by Novoseltsev, on a flash drive with the same video. After learning about everything, he rushes to the place of presentation on his motorcycle, but loses the drive which was hanging on his neck. As a result, he has to improvise using hand-gestures, with the attendance of guests present, to draw diagrams and graphics from the presentation, which he himself made. After the presentation, Anatoly Efremovich makes a proposal to Kalugina by using economic terms, she answers it with a note on the tablet, the image of which is displayed on a large screen, visible to everyone.

In the epilogue, the couple is riding a motorbike in Moscow.

Cast

Lead roles
Svetlana Khodchenkova – Lyudmila Prokofievna Kalugina
Volodymyr Zelensky – Anatoly Efremovich Novoseltsev
Marat Basharov – Yuri Samokhvalov
Anastasia Zavorotnyuk – Olga Ryzhova
Pavel Volya – Vadik, secretary of Kalugina
Sofya Hilkova – Katya Novoseltseva, the eldest daughter of Anatoly Novoseltsev
Veronika Vakulinskaya – Masha Novoseltseva, the youngest daughter of Anatoly Novoseltsev

Supporting roles
Nikita Salopin – investor
Evgeny Koshevoi – Stepan, System Administrator
Sergey Pomerantsev – Valery Volkov, employee
Ekaterina Mikhailova – saleswoman in the store
Denis Onshin – office employee
Irina Frolova – employee of the office
Olesya Ostapenko is an office worker
Anna Azarova – "badger"
Ivan Okhlobystin – psychologist
Alika Smekhova – woman on the session
Timur Rodriguez – host of the party
Aleksey Klimushkin
Dmitry Khrustalev – guest at the party
Sergey Kazanin – the presenter of the presentation
Maria Syomkina – Anna, hostess of a competing agency

Reception
The film received mostly negative reviews in Russian media.

References

External links 

 

Russian romantic comedy films
2011 romantic comedy films
2011 films
Remakes of Russian films
Volodymyr Zelenskyy films